The Ramon Llull Novel Award is an honor given annually to a novel originally written in Catalan. Conceived in 1981 by editor , it is awarded by the Planeta publishing house in conjunction with the Government of Andorra. It confers a monetary prize, originally 250,000 pesetas and now . It recognizes works of the greatest economic value in the Catalan language.

The original objective of the award was not only to encourage the writing of books in Catalan, but also to provide the greatest possible social and commercial dissemination, both to the works and to the authors. Therefore, the winning work is not only published in Catalan, but is immediately translated into Spanish and distributed throughout Spain and Latin America.

Although initially the award was reserved for novels, it is currently also open to essays and memoirs.

Winners

References

External links
  

1981 establishments in Spain
Awards established in 1981
Catalan literary awards
Spanish awards